Maurice is a town in Vermilion Parish, Louisiana, United States. The population was 964 at the 2010 census and 2,118 for the 2020 Census. It is part of the Abbeville micropolitan statistical area.

History

The village, originally called "Mauriceville", derives its name from its founder Maurice Villien. Villien, a native of Savoy, France, came to America in 1855 and sold goods in New Orleans, New Iberia and Milton. His wife had land holdings there and they established a home and grocery store. On May 29, 1889, the  site, on which the church and rectory in Maurice were to be built, was donated by Villien. The town was incorporated on December 27, 1911 and Joseph Villien, Maurice's son, became mayor until 1928. Today, Joseph Street leads to the old home.

The community's first church was La Chapelle a Maurice and Sunday services were held in a small schoolhouse on the Villien property until the St. Alphonsus Church was built in January 1893. The Broussard Cove School was the first school built on land donated by Joseph Clark in 1885 and moved to Maurice in July 1899 to land donated by Maurice Villien. It was located on Maurice Avenue and the Indian Bayou Road until 1914 when it burned down.

Geography
Maurice is located at  (30.107171, -92.123977), along the Gulf Coast in southern Acadiana. According to the United States Census Bureau, the village has a total area of 2.0 square miles (5.3 km), all land. 

The northeastern border of the village is the Vermilion/Lafayette parish line. The communities of Youngsville  and Milton  are both located east of the village via Louisiana Highway 92 which intersects with U.S. 167.

Demographics

At the 2000 United States census, there were 642 people, 257 households, and 177 families residing in the village. At the 2020 population estimates program, there were 1,857 people living in the village, up from 964 at the 2010 United States census.

According to the 2019 American Community Survey, the racial and ethnic makeup of the village was 89.6% non-Hispanic white, 5.9% Black and African American, 0.2% American Indian and Alaska Native, 1.5% Asian alone, and 0.6% two or more races; 2.2% of the population was Hispanic and Latin American of any race. At the 2000 U.S. census, the racial makeup of the village was 79.13% White, 19.63% African American, 0.16% Native American, 0.78% Asian, and 0.31% from two or more races; Hispanic and Latin Americans of any race were 1.40% of the population. In 2005, 74.8% of the population over the age of five spoke English at home, and 25.2% of the population spoke French or Cajun.

In 2000, the median income for a household in the village was $29,306, and the median income for a family was $32,841. Males had a median income of $28,571 versus $21,250 for females. The per capita income for the village was $15,051. About 16.6% of families and 19.3% of the population were below the poverty line, including 22.5% of those under age 18 and 21.8% of those age 65 or over. From 2015 to 2019, the median household income was $67,143. Males had a median income of $54,141 versus $40,139 for females; an estimated 7.8% of the population lived at or below the poverty line.

Notable people
Denise Boutte, actress
Inez Catalon, Creole singer
J. Keith Desormeaux, horse trainer
Kent Desormeaux, Hall of Fame jockey
Ezola B. Foster, conservative political activist and author
Jesse Hernandez, National Football League cheerleader
Jeremy Stephens, chef

References

External links
National Geographic Magazine's November 2005 article featuring Maurice, Louisiana
 Vermilion Historical Society
 Vermilion Parish Tourist Commission

Acadiana
Villages in Louisiana
Villages in Vermilion Parish, Louisiana
Populated places established in 1889